Vyšší Brod Monastery or Hohenfurth Abbey is one of the most important historical landmarks of South Bohemia. It is recognized as a cultural monument by the Ministry of Culture.

The Cistercian monastery is located on the right bank of the river Vltava, in the south-west part of the town of Vyšší Brod. It was founded in 1259. Leopold Wackarž was abbot of this monastery.

The Mass is celebrated exclusively according to the 1962 edition of the Roman Missal (Traditional Latin Mass) with Cistercian propers.

Gallery

References

External links

Cistercian monasteries in the Czech Republic
Buildings and structures in the South Bohemian Region
Tourist attractions in the South Bohemian Region
National Cultural Monuments of the Czech Republic
Český Krumlov District
Bohemian Forest
Communities using the Tridentine Mass
1259 establishments in Europe